Glenn Quagmire, often referred to by just his surname, is a fictional character from the American adult animated series Family Guy. He is a neighbor and friend of the Griffin family and is best known for his hypersexuality and his catchphrase, "Giggity". The show's creator and voice actor Seth MacFarlane describes him as "an appalling human being who is still caught in the Rat Pack era" based on anachronistic 1950s party-animal clichés. The episode "Tiegs for Two" revealed that the surname Quagmire was originally the Polish surname Quagglechek or Quaggleczyk, the suffix -czyk indicating a diminutive in the Polish language.

Origins and vocal style
The name Quagmire was chosen by a college acquaintance of MacFarlane's. MacFarlane came up with Quagmire's voice after listening to fast-talking radio jockeys from the 1950s era, describing the character as a "50s radio guy on coke." The "giggity" phrase was inspired by Steve Marmel's Jerry Lewis impression.

Role in the show
Quagmire is a bachelor who works as a commercial airline pilot. He lives on Spooner Street where he is a neighbor and friend of Peter Griffin, Cleveland Brown and Joe Swanson. He has had two spouses: Joan, a maid for the Griffins who died; and Charmise, a prostitute whom he divorced. The former episode, "I Take Thee Quagmire", was acknowledged by MacFarlane as the first to have a plot revolving around Quagmire.

During his time in Korea in service in Busan, he had a brief career as a soap opera star by the name of "American Johnny" and was lovers with his co-star, Sujin. They would reconnect ties during his brief travel there with Peter, Joe and Cleveland. Quagmire briefly dated Cheryl Tiegs in the early 1980s, but she dumped him because of his constant jealousy and his sex addiction. Cheryl, whom Quagmire considers his long-lost one true love, would again appear twice in Quagmire's life, both times due to Brian Griffin's meddling: the first one, when Brian invited him to dinner under the pretense he was going to dinner with her; the second one, when Brian dated her just to torment him (Quagmire retaliates by dating Brian's ex-girlfriend Jillian). Quagmire despises Brian, and they have a feud that spans several episodes.

In the episode "Quagmire's Baby", he discovers that he has a daughter, Anna Lee, but puts her up for adoption; several episodes imply that Quagmire has fathered several other children. His father, Dan, is introduced in the episode "Quagmire's Dad"; he is a naval veteran of the Vietnam War who has a sex reassignment and becomes a woman named Ida. Quagmire's sister, Brenda, is first seen in the episode "Jerome is the New Black" and is the subject of "Screams of Silence: The Story of Brenda Q". In both episodes she is the victim of domestic violence from her partner Jeff, whom Quagmire murders in order to protect her. The episode "Quagmire's Mom" reveals that he has a strained, dysfunctional relationship with his mother, who had acted sexually towards him; other episodes have implied that the two have actually had sex.

He is characterized as indulging in numerous sexual fetishes such as BDSM, frotteurism, biastophilia, somnophilia, erotic asphyxiation, voyeurism, exhibitionism, zoophilia, and necrophilia. He also has a predilection for teenage girls, including Peter's daughter Meg, whenever they turn 18. Following the episode "Family Goy", he develops a pornography addiction after discovering the existence of internet pornography. When in sexual situations, he often shouts variations of his catchphrase "giggity", which has been used on Family Guy merchandise such as keyrings.

Scenes involving Quagmire's sexual behavior have sometimes been censored by Fox, such as a cut-away in the episode "Airport '07" which implied that he engaged in sex with a dead virgin at her funeral. The Parents Television Council, a long-term critic of Family Guy, says that Quagmire provides "some of the tawdriest moments" in the show.

References

External links
Glenn Quagmire at Fox.com

Animated human characters
Family Guy characters
Fictional commercial aviators
Fictional naval aviators
Fictional rapists
Fictional sailors
Fictional United States Navy personnel
Television characters introduced in 1999
Animated characters introduced in 1999
Fictional characters from Rhode Island
Male characters in animated series
Characters created by Seth MacFarlane
Fictional Polish-American people
sv:Family Guy#Glenn Quagmire